The Ministry of Science, Technology and Innovation (MSTI), is a cabinet-level government ministry of Uganda. It is responsible for the planning, coordinating and implement government efforts to encourage scientific and technological innovation in educational institutions, industry, agriculture, commerce and daily life, on the country's path to middle-income status.

The ministry is headed by Minister of Science, Technology and Innovation, Elioda Tumwesigye.

Location
The headquarters of the ministry are located at Rumee Building, on Lumumba Avenue, in the Central Division of Kampala, Uganda's capital and largest city.

Affiliated agencies
 Uganda National Council for Science and Technology
 National Agricultural Research Organisation
 National Crops Resources Research Institute
 Uganda National Bureau of Standards
 Uganda Virus Research Institute
 Kiira Motors Corporation
 Makerere University
 Uganda National Health Research Organization
 Uganda Industrial Research Institute
Joint Clinical Research Centre
Natural Chemotherapeutic research Institute

See also
Politics of Uganda
Cabinet of Uganda
Parliament of Uganda

References

External links
  Website of the Ministry of Science, Technology and Innovation (Uganda)
 Website of Uganda National Council for Science and Technology 
 Makerere student makes less toxic teargas

Government ministries of Uganda
Science and technology ministries
2016 establishments in Uganda
Ministries established in 2016
Science and technology in Uganda